The Fourth Annual State of Indian Nations Address was delivered by National Congress of American Indians president Joe Garcia on February 2, 2006, at 12:00 p.m. (EST) at the National Press Club, two days after United States President George W. Bush gave his 2006 State of the Union address.

External links
Text of the speech

Native American studies
2006 speeches